Northview Heights Secondary School (also known as Northview Heights SS, NHSS, Northview Secondary or Northview); originally known as Northview Heights Collegiate Institute is a secondary school for grades 9 to 12 in Toronto, Ontario, Canada. It is located in Toronto's north end at the intersection of Bathurst Street and Finch Avenue.

Its feeder schools include Charles H. Best Middle School and Willowdale Middle School.  However, there are many students that attend from different regions specifically for the Honours Math, Science and Technology, CyberARTS, APGA, ICT SHSM (specialist high skills major) and Hospitality SHSM programs.

See also
List of high schools in Ontario
William Thomson Newnham, former principal (1959-1966) and later President of Seneca College

References

 Curriculum-based information for SHSM, copied from edu.gov.on.ca

External links

 Northview Heights Secondary School website
 Toronto District School Board: Northview Heights Secondary School, with a school profile (.pdf) (archived on March 4, 2016)

High schools in Toronto
Schools in the TDSB